Frankoma Pottery is an American pottery company located in Glenpool, Oklahoma. The company is known for its sculptures and dinnerware although the company made many other products including figurines, trivets, and vases. All Frankoma pottery is made in the US from locally excavated clay.

History
Frankoma was founded in 1933 in Norman, Oklahoma, by John Frank, who was a professor of ceramics at the University of Oklahoma from 1927 to 1936. The name Frankoma was derived from "Frank" plus the last three letters of "Oklahoma".  Frank moved the company to Sapulpa in 1938, but rebuilt the factory later that year after a fire.

Frankoma used light-hued local Ada clay in its early products. The light clay was replaced by a Sapulpa OK based brick-red local clay in 1953. John Frank operated the pottery with his wife Grace Lee Frank until his death in 1973. The factory was rebuilt in 1984 after a September 1983 fire destroyed most of the facility. The company filed for Chapter 11 bankruptcy protection in 1990. The Frank's daughter Joniece ran the pottery until 1991 when she was forced to sell the struggling company. The buyer, Richard Bernstein of Maryland, resold the business in 2005 to Det Merryman. 

The company was closed for six weeks and then sold again during the summer of 2008, reopening on August 18 under new owner Joe Ragosta. Ragosta planned to bring back all the employees and continue the Frankoma line of pottery. The year 2008 marked the company's 75-year anniversary. The company closed in 2010 and was auctioned on May 18, 2011. Over a thousand pieces of pottery plus showroom fixtures and equipment were sold. The 1,800 original molds and the Frankoma name were not included in the sale, nor was the real estate. In August 2012, the factory building was sold to a non-pottery manufacturer and the original Frankoma molds and trademark name were sold to FPC LLC.  As of April 2020, pottery continued to be made but in lower volume, focused on artware. 

The 2012 exhibition, Oklahoma Clay: Frankoma Pottery, documented Oklahoma culture through pottery; it took place at the Fred Jones Jr. Museum of Art.

In November of 2022, Frankoma opened a new manufacturing site and storefront in Glenpool, Oklahoma.  Owner Dennis Glascock constructed the facility in hopes of exposing more people to the company’s products and revitalizing the program.

See also
 Tamac Pottery

References

External links
Official website
The History of Frankoma Pottery
History and Examples of Frankoma Pottery
 Encyclopedia of Oklahoma History and Culture - Frankoma Pottery

Ceramics manufacturers of the United States
Companies based in Oklahoma
Design companies established in 1933
U.S. Route 66 in Oklahoma
1933 establishments in Oklahoma